The 2009 Taiwan Series was played by Uni-President 7-Eleven Lions and Brother Elephants, winners of the first and second half-seasons. After seven games, the Lions defeated the Elephants four games to three and won the title.

Participants
Uni-President 7-Eleven Lions - Winner of the first half-season.
Brother Elephants - Winner of the second half-season.

Rules
All regular season rules apply with the following exceptions:
 Each team is allowed to register 28 players on its active roster.
 No tied games.
 Two outfield umpires are added to the games.

Summaries

Game 1
October 17, 2009 at Tainan Municipal Baseball Stadium, Tainan City

Game 2
October 18, 2009 at Douliu Baseball Stadium, Douliu, Yunlin County

Game 3
October 20, 2009 at Chengcing Lake Baseball Field, Niaosong, Kaohsiung County

Game 4
October 21, 2009 at Taichung Intercontinental Baseball Stadium, Taichung City

Game 5
October 22, 2009 at Xinzhuang Baseball Stadium, Xinzhuang City, Taipei County

Game 6
October 24, 2009 at Tainan Municipal Baseball Stadium, Tainan City

This game is the currently the longest game (17 innings) in CPBL's history.

Game 7
October 25, 2009 at Tainan Municipal Baseball Stadium, Tainan City

Taiwan Series
Chinese Professional Baseball League Playoffs, 2009